Curse of the Maya (also known as Dawn of the Living Dead and Evil Grave: Curse of the Maya) is a 2004 American horror film written, directed by and starring David Heavener.

Plot 
Renee, a former junkie still working out psychological issues, moves to the Mexican border with her doctor fiancé, Jeffrey. They befriend Michael, a local caretaker for the windmills in the area. During dinner at Renee's house, the place comes under siege by ancient Mayan zombies who Michael had killed in the past. The dead orphan connects to Renee who feels the need to solve why the ancient Mayan zombies were killed and how to rest their souls.

Cast 
 David Heavener as Michael Richards
 Joe Estevez as Jeffrey Morgan
 Amanda Bauman as Renee Summers
 Andrew Crandall as Mayan Father
 Lauren Aguas as Mother
 Elizabeth Webster as Zombie Daughter
 Robert Aceves as Teenage Boy
 Libertie Heavener as Little Girl
 Todd Bridges as Ruben Herardo

Production 
At the time, Heavener lived in the house used for filming.  Heavener said that the house was haunted by two ghosts, which caused issues during production.

Reception 
Bloody Disgusting rated it 1.5/5 stars and wrote that film fails on every level except for the gore effects and its poster art.  Melissa Bostaph of Dread Central rated it 2.5/5 stars and wrote, "[W]hile I can say the movie is bad, it's not so bad as to be unwatchable."  Jon Condit, also writing for Dread Central, rated it 1.5/5 stars and wrote, "I found the first 70-minutes to be a bore to sit through and the last twenty to be quite entertaining."  Ian Jane of DVD Talk rated it 1.5/5 stars and wrote, "There are plenty of times where low budget films work just fine even with obvious flaws but here, there's nothing to compensate for the cheap looking zombie effects and poorly contrived script."  David Johnson of DVD Verdict called it "an enjoyable low-budget, undead comedy romp".

References

External links 
 

2004 films
2004 horror films
American zombie films
2000s English-language films
2000s American films